Prairietown is an unincorporated community and census-designated place (CDP) in Madison County, Illinois, United States. As of the 2020 census, it had a population of 153. It is part of the Metro East region of Greater St. Louis.

Geography

It drains to the west toward Joulters Creek and to the east toward Sherry Creek, both south-flowing tributaries of Cahokia Creek, which runs southwest to the Mississippi River.

References

Census-designated places in Madison County, Illinois
Census-designated places in Illinois
Unincorporated communities in Madison County, Illinois
Unincorporated communities in Illinois